The Purlawaugh Formation is a Toarcian to Oxfordian geologic formation of New South Wales, Australia. The formation has provided many fossil fish and flora at the Talbragar fossil site.

References

External links 
 Purlawaugh Formation

Geologic formations of Australia
Jurassic System of Australia
Toarcian Stage
Aalenian Stage
Bajocian Stage
Bathonian Stage
Callovian Stage
Oxfordian Stage
Sandstone formations
Shale formations
Lacustrine deposits
Paleontology in New South Wales